Haqnazar Haider Sultan bin Qasim Khan, commonly known as Haqnazar Khan, was the khan of the Kazakh khanate from 1538-1580.  He was the second-oldest son of Qasim Khan and the younger brother of Muhammed Khan.

Haqnazar's name comes from the Arabic word "хақ", which means "“truth, correctness" and the Turko-Persian word "Nazar", which means "vision".  For much of his early life, Haqnazar was simply called by his middle name "Haider", which was given to him in honor of Kasım Khan's Shaybanid uncle, Sheikh Haidar.  He only went by "Haqnazar" after succeeding Ahmed Khan and Toghym Khan as the ruler of the Kazakhs.  

Under Haqnazar Khan, also known as Haq-Nazar or Khaknazar Khan or Ak Nazar Khan, the Kazakh Khanate faced competition from several directions: the Nogai Horde in the west, the Khanate of Sibir in the north, Moghulistan in the east and the Khanate of Bukhara in the south.

Haqnazar Khan began to liberate the occupied Kazakh lands. He returned the northern regions of Sary-Arka to the Kazakh Khanate. Having begun a campaign against the Nogai Horde, Haqnazar reconquered Saray-Juk from the Nogai Horde and the surrounding Kazakh territories as well. In the fight against the Khivans, the Kazakhs conquered the Mangyshlak peninsula and successfully repelled the Oirats. Haqnazar began a campaign against Moghulistan with the aim of finally re-incorporating Jetysu into the Kazakh Khanate. The campaign ended successfully and resulted in defeat for Moghulistan.  However, in the north, there was a threat from the Khanate of Sibir, led by Kuchum Khan.  After successfully defeating Kuchum, Haqnazar reunited the Kazakh tribes and became the sole ruler of the Kazakh Khanate, the first to do so since Tahir Khan.  In doing so, Haqnazar was bestowed with the title "Shah-i-Turan" (Persian for "King of Turan"), a title once held by one of his predecessors Ahmed Khan.  Haqnazar became only the second khan to hold this title.  

In 1568, the Kazakhs successfully defeated the Nogai Horde at the Emba River and reached Astrakhan, but were repelled by Russian forces.

See also
List of Kazakh khans

References

Sources
History of Kazakhstan to 1700 Encyclopædia Britannica Online.

Kazakh khans
1509 births
1580 deaths